Kimber Cornellus Sigler, commonly known as Kim Sigler (né Zeigler; May 2, 1894 – November 30, 1953), was an American attorney and politician who served as the 40th governor of Michigan from 1947 to 1949.

Early life
Sigler was born Kimber Cornellus Zeigler in Schuyler, Nebraska, the son of Bertha and David Zeigler. The family's surname was changed to Sigler during World War I. He was educated at the University of Michigan, and later at the University of Detroit Mercy where, in 1918, he received a law degree. Sigler established a successful legal career in various firms in Detroit, Hastings and Battle Creek, Michigan. He was also the special prosecutor in the grand jury investigation of corruption in the state legislature. He married Mae L. Pierson and they had one child together.

Politics
In 1928, Sigler was the Democratic candidate for Michigan Attorney General, yet was unsuccessful losing to Republican Wilber Marion Brucker, who was elected Governor of Michigan two years later. Sigler would later switch to the Republican Party. In 1942, he was a candidate in the Republican primary from the 8th District for a seat in the state senate. He was also a member of Rotary International.

On November 5, 1946, Sigler, nicknamed Hollywood Kim, was elected Governor of Michigan, defeating former governor Murray Van Wagoner in the general election. During his two years in office, state agencies were reorganized and the department of administration was created. In 1947, he received his Private Pilot License.

In 1948, he served as a delegate to the Republican National Convention, which re-nominated Thomas Dewey as their candidate for U.S. President to defeat President Harry S Truman, yet Dewey was again unsuccessful as he was against Franklin Roosevelt four years earlier. Dewey carried Michigan, but Sigler was unsuccessful that year, as he was defeated for re-election for governor by Democrat Soapy Williams. After running unsuccessfully for re-election, Sigler left office on January 1, 1949, and retired from political life.

Retirement and death
Nearly five years after leaving office at the age of fifty-nine, Sigler and three passengers were killed when the plane he was piloting on a foggy night collided with a television broadcast tower (WBCK-TV) near Augusta, Michigan. He was interred at Riverside Cemetery of Hastings, Michigan.

Historical Marker

A marker designating Sigler's home in Hastings as a Michigan Historic Site was erected in 1987 by the Bureau of History, Michigan Department of State. The inscription reads:

Kim Sigler (1894-1953), a native of Schuyler, Nebraska, received his law degree from the University of Detroit in 1918. While attending law school, Sigler worked at Henry Ford’s Highland Park plant. He first practiced law in Detroit, where he worked in the office of Edwin Denby, former secretary of the navy, and Judge Arthur Webster. In 1922 his family moved to Hastings. A Democrat at that time, he was elected as Barry County prosecutor for three consecutive terms. In 1928 he unsuccessfully ran against Wilber M. Brucker for attorney general. In the late 1920s Sigler took office as city attorney, serving in that capacity for over ten years. He returned to private practice and moved to Battle Creek in 1943.

Kim Sigler’s vigor and courtroom manner led to his selection as a special prosecutor for a grand jury probe of legislative graft in 1943. The success of this investigation gave him a statewide reputation. Though originally a Democrat, he won the Republican gubernatorial nomination and election in 1946. His was one of the largest gubernatorial majorities in the country that year. In office, he created the Department of Administration, effected changes in the Prison and Corrections Department, and revitalized the unemployment compensation program and the Public Service Commission. However, he faced an uncooperative legislature and division within his cabinet. He was defeated for reelection in 1948. He died while piloting his own plane in a crash near Battle Creek on November 30, 1953.

References

External links 
Kim Sigler at National Governors Association
Kim Silger at Political Graveyard
Aviation article references Sigler getting his pilot certificate

1894 births
1953 deaths
Governors of Michigan
Aviators killed in aviation accidents or incidents in the United States
Methodists from Michigan
Accidental deaths in Michigan
Michigan Republicans
University of Michigan alumni
University of Detroit Mercy alumni
People from Schuyler, Nebraska
Michigan Democrats
Burials in Michigan
Republican Party governors of Michigan
20th-century American politicians
Victims of aviation accidents or incidents in 1953